The Blackwater River Correctional Facility  is a private state prison for men located in Milton, Santa Rosa County, Florida, which was opened in 2010 by the GEO Group under contract with the Florida Department of Corrections.  This facility houses about 2,000 inmates at a variety of security levels.

Notable inmates
Sky Bouche, sentenced to 30 years for the Forest High School shooting that injured only one student by shooting through the door.
Anthony Todt, Todt Family Murders sentenced to life for the murders of his wife, three young children, and the family dog Breezy, in December 2019.

References

Prisons in Florida
Buildings and structures in Santa Rosa County, Florida
GEO Group
2010 establishments in Florida